Kotu is an island in Lulunga district, in the Ha'apai islands of Tonga. As of 1992, there was one village on the island with a population of approximately 200 people.

References 

Islands of Tonga
Haʻapai